French race car manufacturer Mygale has designed, developed, and produced Formula 3 race since 2006, built to FIA standards, and conforming to the FIA's rules and regulations. A modified version, used in the various Formula Three Regional series' (i.e., Formula Regional European Championship, Formula Regional Asian Championship, Formula Regional Indian Championship, and Formula Regional Japanese Championship)), is updated, based on, and complying with the rules and regulations used in the FIA Formula 3 Championship (similarly to the Dallara F3 2019) since 2019.

References 

Open wheel racing cars
Formula Three cars